Ádám Szabó may refer to:
 Ádám Szabó (footballer)
 Ádám Szabó (singer)